Brava or La Brava may refer to:

Geography
Brava, Cape Verde, a volcanic island
Brava, Costa Rica, an island of Costa Rica (Isla Brava)
Costa Brava, a coastal area Mediterranean of northeast Spain
Barawa, a town in Somalia commonly known as Brava
La Brava Lake
La Brava San Javier Department, Santa Fe
Ciénaga La Brava Pedraza, Magdalena
La Brava Atlántida, Uruguay

People
Linda Brava, Finnish violinist
La Brava (My Hero Academia), a character in the manga series My Hero Academia

Books
La Brava, Elmore Leonard

Brands
Vauxhall Brava, a pickup truck
Fiat Bravo/Brava, a car
Brava, a brand of premium lager from  the Lakeport Brewing Company
Brava, an infrared countertop oven

Film and TV
Brava, a Dutch cultural television channel

Music
"Brava", a song by Mina, 1965
Brava, an album by Rebeca, 2000
Brava! (Paulina Rubio album), 2011
Brava (Brodinski album), 2015
Brava (Lali Espósito album), 2018

See also
 Braava, an iRobot brand of floor cleaning devices
 Brava!, a roller coaster installed at Mass MoCA as part of an exhibit by EJ Hill